The B. Lowenstein & Brothers Building is a historic building in Memphis, Tennessee, U.S. It was built in 1924 for the Lowenstein Company, a clothing company founded by Benedict Lowenstein, a German immigrant, in 1855. It was designed in the Beaux-Arts architectural style by Hanker & Cairns. It has been listed on the National Register of Historic Places since June 16, 1983.

References

Buildings and structures on the National Register of Historic Places in Tennessee
Beaux-Arts architecture in Tennessee
Buildings and structures completed in 1924
Buildings and structures in Memphis, Tennessee